Trachyspermum roxburghianum (also known as Carum roxburghianum) is a flowering plant in the family Apiaceae. It is grown extensively in South Asia, Southeast Asia, and Indonesia. Its aromatic dried fruits, like those of its close relative ajwain, are often used in Bengali cuisine but are rarely used in the rest of India. The fresh leaves are used as an herb in Thailand and it is used medicinally in Myanmar and Sri Lanka.

Characteristics
The small dried fruits, commonly referred to as seeds, are similar in appearance to those of ajwain, celery, and caraway. Because of their similarity in both appearance and flavor, it is often confused or substituted with celery seed.

Etymology
Known as ' in Bengali, is often confused with celery and is known as wild celery in English.

Uses
It is a very strong spice, with a characteristic smell similar to parsley and a taste similar to celery. A couple of pinches can easily overpower a curry. In Bengali cuisine the seeds are used whole, quickly fried in very hot oil until they crackle. It is commonly used in the Bengali dish . They are sometimes part of a local  (Bengali five spice) mixture replacing black mustard seeds; the other ingredients are cumin seed, fenugreek seed, fennel seed, and Nigella Seed. In other places, a common use is in pickling or spice mixtures. It is commonly used as an herb for diarrhea, gastritis, loss of appetite, vomiting, abdominal distention, stomachache related to indigestion and also for worm diseases.

References

Apiaceae
Spices
Indian spices